Todd Woodbridge and Mark Woodforde won in the final 7–6, 7–6 against Martin Damm and Andrei Olhovskiy.

Seeds
Champion seeds are indicated in bold text while text in italics indicates the round in which those seeds were eliminated.

 Todd Woodbridge /  Mark Woodforde (champions)
 Paul Haarhuis /  Mark Knowles (semifinals)
 Byron Black /  Jonathan Stark (first round)
 Martin Damm /  Andrei Olhovskiy (final)

Draw

References
 1996 Singapore Open Doubles Draw

Singapore Open (men's tennis)
1996 ATP Tour
1996 in Singaporean sport